Alexandre Trauner (born Sándor Trau; 3 August 1906 in Budapest, Hungary – 5 December 1993 in Omonville-la-Petite, France) was a Hungarian film production designer.

After studying painting at Hungarian Royal Drawing School, he left the country in 1929, fleeing from the antisemitic government of Admiral Horthy. In Paris, he became the assistant of set designer Lazare Meerson, at the studios in Épinay-sur-Seine working on such films as À nous la liberté (1932) and La Kermesse héroïque (1935). In 1937, he became a chief set designer.

Trauner worked with director Marcel Carné for some years on such films as Port of Shadows (Quai des brumes, 1938), Le Jour se lève (1939), and Children of Paradise (Les Enfants du paradis, 1945). Trauner worked in hiding on Children of Paradise, which was filmed at the Victorine Studios in Nice during 1943 and 1944 during the Nazi's Occupation of France.

He worked with Billy Wilder on eight films between 1958 and 1978, including the sets for The Apartment (1960), on which he made use of false perspective, a characteristic of his work. For his work on this film, he won an Academy Award. He also worked on John Huston's The Man Who Would Be King (1975), Joseph Losey's Don Giovanni (1979), and Luc Besson's Subway (1985).

In 1980, he was a member of the jury at the 30th Berlin International Film Festival.

Selected filmography
 Ciboulette (1933)
 Another World (1937)
 Woman of Malacca (1937)
 Children of Paradise (1945)
 Mollenard (1938)
 Hotel du Nord (1938)
 Port of Shadows (1938)
 The Curtain Rises (1938)
 Gates of the Night (1946)
 The Misfortunes of Sophie (1946)
 La Marie du port (1950)
 Juliette, or Key of Dreams (1951)
 Miracles Only Happen Once (1951)
 Rififi (1955)
 Lady Chatterley's Lover (1955)
 The Light Across the Street (1956)
 Mademoiselle Striptease (1956)
 The Apartment (1960)
 One, Two, Three (1961)
 Once More, with Feeling! (1960)
 Irma la Douce (1963)
 Behold a Pale Horse (1964)
 How to Steal a Million (1966)
 The Night of the Generals (1967)
 A Flea in Her Ear (1968)
 The Private Life of Sherlock Holmes (1970)
 The Man Who Would Be King (1975)
 Fedora (1978)
 The Fiendish Plot of Dr. Fu Manchu (1980)
  (1983)
 Round Midnight (1986)

See also
 Art Directors Guild Hall of Fame

References

External links 

 
 Trauner's official web site

1906 births
1993 deaths
Best Art Direction Academy Award winners
European Film Awards winners (people)
Hungarian art directors
Hungarian Jews
Film people from Budapest
Production designers
Hungarian University of Fine Arts alumni